Steve Silberman is an American writer for Wired magazine and has been an editor and contributor there for 14 years. In 2010, Silberman was awarded the AAAS "Kavli Science Journalism Award for Magazine Writing." His featured article, known as "The Placebo Problem" discussed the impact of placebos on the pharmaceutical industry.

Silberman's 2015 book Neurotribes, which discusses the autism rights and neurodiversity movements, was awarded the Samuel Johnson Prize.  Additionally, Silberman's Wired article "The Geek Syndrome", which focused on autism in Silicon Valley, has been referenced by many sources and has been described as a culturally significant article for the autism community.

Silberman's Twitter account made Time magazine's list of the best Twitter feeds for the year 2011.

Personal life
Silberman studied psychology at Oberlin College in Oberlin, Ohio, then received a master's degree in English literature from Berkeley, where his thesis advisor was Thom Gunn.

Silberman moved to San Francisco in 1979, drawn by three factors: so that he could live "a gay life without fear"; because of the music of Crosby, Stills and Nash, the Grateful Dead, and others; and so he could be near the San Francisco Zen Center. He was friends with the musician David Crosby with whom he hosted a podcast.

Silberman studied with Allen Ginsberg at Naropa University in 1977. After Silberman interviewed Ginsberg for Whole Earth Review in 1987 the two became friends and Ginsberg invited Silberman to be his teaching assistant the next term at Naropa University. The Beat Generation is a regular subject in Silberman's writings. Silberman lives with his husband Keith, a high-school science teacher, to whom he has been married since 2003.

NeuroTribes

Silberman's 2015 book NeuroTribes documents the origins and history of autism from a neurodiversity viewpoint. The book has received mostly positive reviews from both scientific and popular media. In a review published in Science-Based Medicine Harriet Hall, MD also known as The SkepDoc described Neurotribes as "the most complete history of autism I have seen" and recommends it as "a welcome ray of clarity, sanity, and optimism". In The New York Times Book Review, Jennifer Senior wrote that the book was "beautifully told, humanizing, important";  the Boston Globe called it "as emotionally resonant as any [book] this year"; and in Science, the cognitive neuroscientist Francesca Happé wrote, "It is a beautifully written and thoughtfully crafted book, a historical tour of autism, richly populated with fascinating and engaging characters, and a rallying call to respect difference." It was named one of the best books of 2015 by The New York Times, The Economist, Financial Times, The Guardian, and many other outlets. Anil Ananthaswamy described Silberman's book in Literary Review as a "comprehensive, thoroughly researched and eminently readable" book about autism, which showcases Silberman’s strengths as a journalist: "the writing is crisp, clear and engaging."

Some other reviews were less positive, for example James Harris of Johns Hopkins University criticized NeuroTribes as a book that pushes an agenda, saying that Silberman misrepresented Leo Kanner as somebody who had a negative view towards autistics and their parents, rather than, as Harris argued, an advocate for individualized treatment for every child.

Silberman has stated that a key point from the book is to recognize the need for accommodating autism as a significant disability in the same way that society accommodates people in wheelchairs.

Awards
2015 Samuel Johnson Prize
2015 Books for a Better Life Psychology Award, Southern New York National Multiple Sclerosis Society
2016 Health Book of the Year, Medical Journalists' Association
2016 Silver Medal, Nonfiction, California Book Awards
2016 Erikson Institute Prize for Excellence in Mental Health Media
2016 ARC Catalyst Awards Author of the Year

Publications

Books

Selected articles

Film appearances
 2017 Grateful Dead documentary Long Strange Trip

References

External links
 NeuroTribes blog at Public Library of Science (PLoS)
 Steve Silberman's personal webpage
 Steve Silberman on twitter
 
 "The forgotten history of autism" (TED2015)

American Buddhists
American science writers
Autism activists
American gay writers
Jewish American writers
LGBT Buddhists
LGBT Jews
Living people
Oberlin College alumni
Writers from the San Francisco Bay Area
Year of birth missing (living people)
American health activists
21st-century American Buddhists